Animal X is a Romanian band awarded at MTV Europe Music Awards, with more than 10 years of musical experience. Their eight studio albums include such hits as "N-am crezut", "Pentru ea", "Fără tine", "Mai mult ca oricand", "Sa pot ierta", "Baieti derbedei", "Balada", and "Nisip purtat de vant".

Band members 
 Şerban Miron Copot (Hyena) - July 2, 1981 - vocals
 Laurenţiu Penca (Worm) - September 5, 1983 - voice2, synth
 George Valentin Belu (Martian Boy) - July 28, 1983 - guitar
 Lazar Cercel (King Goat) - November 28, 1981 - bass
 Alexandru Ivanus (Cricket) - September 29, 1986 - drums
 Alexandru Salaman (Lizzard) - February 8, 1982 – 2010 - voice

Performances
1999 - May 15  – first official appearance on local TV in Constanța, Animal X is made up by Hyena, Worm and Lizard
2000 – First album release, named “Animal X”
2000 - “N-am crezut” (Can’t Believe) is the first Romanian song to stay in Top100 for 18 weeks
2000 - “3rd Millennium” tour – 21 cities, around 940 000 spectators
2000 - “Iubirea mea” (My Love) is the fastest ascending song in Romanian music charts
2000 - Second great tour, the “Internet Generation”, covering 36cities and over 1,4mil. spectators
2001 - “Level 2” album hits daylight
2001 - “Pentru ea” (to her) stays No1 in RT100 for 5 weeks
2001 - "Fără tine" (without you) stays No1 in RT100 for 4 weeks
2001 - “Best Dance Music” award – Mamaia festival
2001 - “Best Dance Music” award – Romanian  Music Industry Awards
2001 - 3rd studio release, “Virtual” album
2001 - “Sa pot ierta” (To Forgive..) is the first Romanian single to stay in radio charts for 23 weeks; it also stays No1 in RT100 for 3 weeks in January-February 2002
2001 - “The Masters of House Music award”, Romanian  Music Industry Awards
2002 - “Revolution” album release
2002 - “Best Dance Music award”, Romanian Music Industry Awards
2002 - “Best Romanian Act award” - M.T.V. Europe EMA Barcelona, first of its kind in Romania
2002 - “Say no to drugs Tour”, 34cities, with over2,2mil. spectators; CNN declares it “the biggest social campaign in Eastern Europe”
2003 - 4 nominations and “Best Album award”, MTV Romanian Music Awards
2004 - “FunRaptor” album release
2005 - Animal X attends the Chinese European Fest, live broadcast by CCTV and Shanghai TV
2005 - Member martian boy, King Goat and Cricket join the band
2006 – “Derbedei” (Rebel boys) album release
2006 - “Best feat. award”, Romanian Top Hit Awards, Bacau City
2006 - Animal X attends the “Zaragoza Global” International Urban Music Fest, Spain
2006 - “The Green Generation” foundation takes shape, founded by Animal X
2007 – First “Best of” album is released
2007 - “Best Rock award”, Romanian Top Hit, Bacau City
2007 - Novamusic Entertainment  Label grants a 5 Diamond Disk award for exceptional Animal X entire career sales and a Golden Disk award for the “Best of”album
2008 – September – Animal X signs with Mediapro Music Label
2008 - October – the 8th studio album, “Sâmbure de drac” (Devil in Disguise)
2008 - October - First single is released, called “Nisip purtat de vânt” (Sand in the wind)
2009 – January – “Confidential”, award for the “Nisip purtat de vânt” single
2009 - 3 nominations at Romanian Top Hit Awards
2009 – '“Unii dintre noi” single'
2010 – January -  Lizard leaves the band
2010 - March  – new single release, “Love philosophy”
2010 - March–June – 69 concerts at Globus Circus&Variety  within “4U” Show
2015 - In puii mei

Discography
 Animal X - 2000, EP, Nova Music
 Level 2 - 2001, LP, Nova Music
 Virtual - 2001 EP, Nova Music
 Revolution - 2002, LP, Music&Music
 FunRaptor - 2004 LP, A&A Records
 baieti derbedei - 2006, LP, Nova Music
 Best Of - 2007 LP, Nova Music
 sambure de drac - 2008, LP, MediaPro Music

References

Romanian pop music groups
MTV Europe Music Award winners